Pakistan Scouts may be:

Gilgit-Baltistan Scouts
Gilgit Scouts
Pakistan Boy Scouts Association